Canon Edward Sell (January 24, 1839 – February 15, 1932) was an Anglican orientalist, writer, and missionary in India.

Biography 

Sell was born on 24 January 1839 in Wantage in Berkshire. He was educated at the Church Missionary College in Islington, London, completing his studies in 1862. In 1874 Sell was appointed as a fellow of Madras University and he received a Bachelor of Divinity from Lambeth in 1881. Sell received an honorary Doctor of Divinity from the University of Edinburgh in 1907. He was a member of the Royal Asiatic Society and was awarded the Kaiser-i-Hind Gold Medal in 1906. He was also appointed "Chairman of the Arabic, Persian, and Hindustani Studies".

After finishing his studies in 1862, Sell was ordained deacon and in 1867, priest. Sell served as the examining chaplain for the Bishop of Madras and in 1889 he was appointed canon at St George's Cathedral, Madras. He is commemorated by a plaque in the Cathedral.

In 1865 Sell became the principal of the Harris High School for Muslims in Madras in which capacity he continued until 1881. It was also during this time that he was secretary of the Church Missionary Society for the dioceses of Madras and Travancore. He officially retired from the CMS in 1923, but continued to live in India, involving himself in scholarship and ministry. When he died in Bangalore on 15 February 1932, he was working on his fiftieth book. Sell wrote extensively on Islam and biblical subjects, in particular, the Old Testament. His works include:
The Faith of Islam, London, 1880
ʼIlm-I-Tajwīd; or, The Art of Reading the Qurān With an Account of the Rules for the Rasm-Ul-Khat, and a List of the Various Readings of the Last Sura, 1882
Jāmi'-Ul-Qavānīn. An Urdu Grammar, with Chapters on Rhetoric and Prosody, 1885
The Historical Development of the Quran, 1897
Essays on Islam, 1901
Islam: its Rise and Progress, 1907
The Religious Orders of Islam, 1908
The Khulafar-Rashidun, 1909
The Cult of Ali, 1909
The Battles of Badr and Uhud, 1909
Al-Quran, 1909
Sufiism, 1910
The Druses, 1910
Ghazwas and Sariyas, 1911 
The Hanífs, 1912
Outlines of Islám, 1912
The Life of Muhammad, 1913
The Historical Development of the Quran
Manʹaziruʹl-qawaʹid; a Persian grammar, with chapters on rhetoric and prosody, 1911.
Baháism, 1912
Muslims in China, 1913
Steadfast and Abounding, 1914
Muslim Conquests in North Africa, 1914
Muslim Conquests in Spain, 1914
The Mamluks in Egypt, 1914 
The Umayyad and the ʻAbbasid Khalifates, 1914
The Ottoman Turks, 1915
The Minor Prophets, 1922
The Songs of the Outlaw and Other Songs, Being an Exposition of Some Historical Psalms, 1922
Daniel, 1923
After Malachi, 1923
The Making of a Nation (Judges),1923
Isaiah (I-XXXIX), 1923
The Life and Times of Jeremiah, 1923
Ithna ʻAsharíyya, or, The Twelve Shiʻah Imams, 1923
The Megilloth, 1924
Chronicles, Ezra, and Nehemiah, 1924
Deuteronomy, 1924
The Book of Job, 1924
The Kingdom of Israel, 1925
The Book of Genesis, 1925
Exodus and Numbers, 1925
Leviticus, 1925
The Apocalypses, 1925
The Kingdom of Judah, 1926
The Undivided Kingdom, 1926
The Samaritan and Other Jewish Sects, 1927
A Guide to the Study of the Canon of the Old and New Testaments, 1927
The Talmud, Mishnah, and Midrash, 1928
Studies in Islam, 1928
Islam in Spain, 1929
The Áyyub and Mamluk Sultans, 1929
Messianic Hope, 1929
Inspiration, 1930
The Exile, 1931
Covenants: The Day of the Lord, 1931
The Glorious Company of the Apostles and Other Sermons, n.d.

References

External links
 
 

English Anglican missionaries
Anglican missionaries in India
Anglican writers
19th-century English Anglican priests
Holders of a Lambeth degree
Recipients of the Kaisar-i-Hind Medal
Christian scholars of Islam
1839 births
1932 deaths
People from Wantage
Alumni of the Church Missionary Society College, Islington
English emigrants to India